Achoura is a 2018 horror film directed and co-written by Talal Selhami. An international co-production of Morocco and France, the film stars Younes Bouab, Sofiia Manousha, Iván González, Moussa Maaskri, and Omar Lofti. The film's plot follows four childhood friends who reconnect when one of them, who disappeared 25 years prior during the Ashura holiday, re-enters their lives, leading them to confront a monstrous djinn.

Described as the first monster movie shot in Morocco, Achoura premiered in December 2018 at the Paris International Fantastic Film Festival.

Cast
 Younes Bouab
 Sofiia Manousha
 Iván González
 Moussa Maaskri
 Omar Lofti

Production
Filming took place in Morocco, around Casablanca, in 2015. Producer Fabrice Lambot described the film as "the first monster movie shot in Morocco."

Release
Achoura premiered in December 2018 at the Paris International Fantastic Film Festival. The film then screened at the Brussels International Fantastic Film Festival on 12 April 2019. It had its North American premiere at the Cinepocalypse Film Festival in Chicago, Illinois, in June 2019, and later screened at the Sitges Film Festival in Spain in October 2019.

In 2021, Dark Star Pictures acquired distribution rights for Achoura; the film is set to be released on DVD and digital platforms in the United States on December 14, 2021.

Reception
In a mostly positive review of the film for Bloody Disgusting, Patrick Bromley noted the similarities between Achoura—which was shot in 2015—and the 2017 film It and its 2019 sequel. Bromley wrote that Achoura "offers a unique look into the fears and folklore of another culture. That it's so reminiscent of It does it a disservice, even if the movie itself cannot be faulted for the comparison. It's a serious, somber meditation on the death of innocence, bleaker than what Stephen King offers and full of powerful, evocative imagery all the way to its final moments."

References

External links
 

2010s supernatural horror films
2018 horror films
Moroccan horror films
French horror films
Films shot in Morocco
2010s French films
2010s monster movies
Religious horror films
Films based on African myths and legends